Humphrey Humphreys (24 November 1648 – 20 November 1712) was successively Bishop of Bangor (1689–1701) and Bishop of Hereford (1701–1712).

Life

Born 24 November 1648 in Hendre, Penrhyndeudraeth, the eldest son of Richard Humphreys and Margaret, daughter of Robert Wynne of Cesailgyfarch, Caernarfonshire.
He was educated at Oswestry and Bangor grammar schools, and then at Jesus College, Oxford, graduating B.A. 1669, M.A. 1672, being elected a Fellow of Jesus College 1672–3, B.D. 1679, and D.D. 1682.

He served as chaplain to the Bishop of Bangor, then as rector of Llanfrothen (1670) and Trawsfynydd (1672). He was Dean of Bangor from 1680, and elected Bishop in 1689.

A patron of Welsh literature, genealogical research and of the then newly formed Society for Promoting Christian Knowledge (SPCK). Humphreys stands out among Welsh bishops of his period. Edward Lhuyd spoke highly of his competence as an antiquarian.

References

1648 births
1712 deaths
People educated at Friars School, Bangor
Alumni of Jesus College, Oxford
Fellows of Jesus College, Oxford
Bishops of Bangor
Bishops of Hereford
17th-century Welsh Anglican bishops
18th-century Church of England bishops